Koilkonda is a Mandal in Mahbubnagar district, Telangana.

Geography
It has an average elevation of 464 metres (1525 ft).

Situated nearby perched on a hilltop is the Koilkonda Fort, the erstwhile outpost of the Qutb Shahi dynasty. It is on the NH 7,125 km from Hyderabad. To reach the top, one needs to trudge across a deep canyon on the west or a series of streams if coming through east before reaching a plight of steps that leads to the fort. There are seven gates leading to the fort. The first one has an inscription of Ibrahim Qutb Shah that dates back to 1550. The fourth gate leads to a dilapidated palace. Along with the fort, which itself is a magnificent structure, there is also a mosque and an eidgah.

Institutions
 There is a Fort in Koilkonda built by Ibrahim Qutub Shah, one of the Golkonda kings.
 Zilla Parishad High School.
 Guru Raghavendra Vidyalaya
 State Bank of Hyderabad.

Villages
The villages in Koilkonda mandal include:
 Abhangapatnam 	
 Acharyapur 	
 Ankilla 	
 Burugupally 	
 Chandapur 	
 Chandraspalle	
 Dammaipally 	
 Garlapad
 Ibrahimnagar 	
 Jamalpur 	
 Keshavapoor 	
 Khazipur 	
 Koilkonda 	
 Kothlabad 	
 Malkapur 	
 Manikonda
 Modipur 	
 Parpalle 	
 Perikiveedu 	
 Rampur 	
 Sanganonipally 	
 Serivenkatapur 	
 Suraram
 
 Thirumulampalle
 Veerampally 	
Vinjamur
 Yellareddi Pally
 Lingupally

References

Mandals in Mahbubnagar district
Tourist attractions in Mahbubnagar district